= Thua Kheda =

- village
- Location within Madhya Pradesh Location within India
- Coordinates: 23.116482°N 77.411360°E
- Country: India
- State: Madhya Pradesh
- District: Bhopal
- Tehsil: Huzur

Population (2011)
  - Total: 896
- Time zone: UTC+5:30 (IST)
- ISO 3166 code: MP-IN
- Census code: 482528

Thua Kheda is a village in the Bhopal district of Madhya Pradesh, India. It is located in the Huzur tehsil and the Phanda block.

== Demographics ==
According to the 2011 census of India, Thua Kheda has 175 households. The effective literacy rate (i.e. the literacy rate of population excluding children aged 6 and below) is 60.81%.

Demographics (2011 Census)
	Total	Male	Female
Population	896	458	438
Children aged below 6 years	156	96	60
Scheduled caste	58	30	28
Scheduled tribe	87	45	42
Literates	450	258	192
Workers (all)	316	227	89
Main workers (total)	150	140	10
Main workers: Cultivators	60	58	2
Main workers: Agricultural labourers	68	63	5
Main workers: Household industry workers	0	0	0
Main workers: Other	22	19	3
Marginal workers (total)	166	87	79
Marginal workers: Cultivators	15	7	8
Marginal workers: Agricultural labourers	146	77	69
Marginal workers: Household industry workers	0	0	0
Marginal workers: Others	5	3	2
Non-workers	580	231	349
